Epimachus Jacobus Johannes Baptista (Eppo) Cremers (15 June 1823 in Groningen – 27 October 1896 in Zürich) was a Dutch politician.

He was Minister of Foreign Affairs from March 1864 to June 1866 and thrice Speaker of the House of Representatives of the Netherlands in between 1884 and 1888.

References
Mr. E.J.J.B. Cremers at Parlement & Politiek (Dutch)

1823 births
1896 deaths
Ministers of Foreign Affairs of the Netherlands
Speakers of the House of Representatives (Netherlands)
Members of the House of Representatives (Netherlands)
Independent politicians in the Netherlands
Politicians from Groningen (city)
University of Groningen alumni